Rainer Kaufmann (born 6 June 1959) is a German film director.

Selected filmography
Dann eben mit Gewalt (1993, TV film) — (based on a novel by )
 (1994, TV film)
One of My Oldest Friends (1995) — (based on a story by F. Scott Fitzgerald)
Talk of the Town (1995)
The Pharmacist (1997) — (based on a novel by Ingrid Noll)
Long Hello and Short Goodbye (1999) — (screenplay by Jeff Vintar)
Cold Is the Evening Breeze (2000) — (based on a novel by Ingrid Noll)
 (2004, TV miniseries) — (based on a novel by Justus Pfaue)
 (2005, TV film)
Four Daughters (2006, TV film) — (based on a novel by Inger Alfvén)
Runaway Horse (2007) — (based on a novella by Martin Walser)
A Grand Exit (2008, TV film)
 (2010, TV film)
 (2011, TV film)
 (2011, TV film) — (based on a novel by )
 (2012, TV film)
 (2014, TV film)
 (2017, TV film) — (based on a novel by )
 (2018, TV film)
 (2019)

References

External links 

1959 births
Living people
Mass media people from Frankfurt